Golden Valley High School may refer to the following schools in the United States:

Golden Valley High School (Bakersfield, California)
Golden Valley High School (Merced, California)
Golden Valley High School (Santa Clarita, California)